The nuclear-powered Charlie-I Soviet submarine K-320 had a reactor accident prior to commissioning while under construction. The event occurred on January 18, 1970. The submarine was repaired, commissioned on September 15, 1971, and was stricken in 1994.

The 1970 radiological incident
To be finished for Vladimir Lenin's 100th anniversary, construction of K-320 was rushed. During a hydraulic test of the primary coolant circuit, the reactor became prompt critical and generated full effect for 10–15 seconds. The finding was that plugs on the primary test failed, so a powerful fountain of water and steam poured all around the K-308 the assembly shop. Twelve dockworkers near the reactor were killed immediately by the steam generated by the uncontrolled reaction and 150-200 others were directly contaminated. Most of the contamination was contained in the workshop but a cloud of radioactive gas and particulates contaminated up to 2000 people in the area around the shipyard.

The radiation level in the workshop reached 60 thousand roentgens and the total release of activity into the workshop premises was 75 thousand Curie. Contamination of the area was avoided due to the closed nature of the workshop, but radioactive water was discharged into the Volga.

References

Bibliography

External links
https://web.archive.org/web/20050901050735/http://www.submarine.id.ru/sub.php?670
http://www.radfilms.com/PEN_World_Congress_Nikitin_Verdict.html
http://www.bellona.org/english_import_area/casefile/international/russia/envirorights/nikitin/c-court1998/1140457655.92

Charlie-class submarines
Ships built in the Soviet Union
1971 ships
Cold War submarines of the Soviet Union
Soviet submarine accidents
1970 in the Soviet Union